Marion Township is an inactive township in St. Francois County, in the U.S. state of Missouri.

Marion Township was erected in 1836, taking its name from Francis Marion, an army officer during the American Revolutionary War.

References

Townships in Missouri
Townships in St. Francois County, Missouri